Tour Granite is an office skyscraper in La Défense, the high-rise business district situated west of Paris, France.

Tour Granite was opened in December 2008. The building is designed by French architect Christian de Portzamparc. It is the fifth tallest building in la Défense, after Tour First, Tour Total, Tour Areva and Tour T1.

Tour Granite was ordered by the Société Générale banking group. It was built as a complement to the Société Générale twin towers whose office space was insufficient for the needs of the group. Like the existing two towers, Tour Granite has a sharply inclined roof.

See also
 List of tallest structures in Paris

References

External links
 La Tour Granite – PERI S.A.S
 Tour Granite (Emporis)

Granite
Granite
Office buildings completed in 2008
Société Générale
21st-century architecture in France